Rukh may refer to:

 Rukh, Iran, a village in Hormozgan Province, Iran
 MCS Rukh, a municipal stadium in the Ivano-Frankivsk city park, Ukraine
 Rukh (Star Wars), a character in the Star Wars universe
 People's Movement of Ukraine or Rukh
 Roc (mythology) or Rukh, a mythological giant bird
 Rukh, an ancestor god of the Dwarfs in the Warhammer fantasy fictional universe
 Rukh, the "home of souls" and source of all natural phenomena in the world of Magi: The Labyrinth of Magic
 Rukh, the jungle, in Kipling's first written story about Mowgli, "In the Rukh"
 Rukh (film), a 2017 Indian film
 Rook (chess), from Persian  رخ (transliterated rukh or rokh)

See also
 Lalla Rookh
 Rokh (disambiguation) (Persian: رخ)
 Shah rukh, mythical bird